The House of Bove is an ancient noble patrician family of Ravello, Maritime Republic of Amalfi that held royal appointments in the Kingdom of Naples, and presided over feudal territories. After the dissolution of noble seats of the Kingdom of Naples in 1800 they were ascribed in the Libro d'Oro of Ravello. The Bove coat of arms is prominently displayed in the Duomo of Ravello.

History

Knights (Cavaliere) of the House of Bove traveled north to Germany, where they lead many armed forces with the House of Grisone. Count Carl of Anjou, later titled King Charles I of Naples requested their support against King Conradin of Sicily.
 
In the 13th century King Charles I of Naples ennobled Sergio Bove of the House of Bove with title and feudal territories in Bitonto. Sergio Bove's title allowed him to administer trade and commerce in his feudal territories.

November 1, 1419 the House of Bove received partial exoneration of taxes from Queen Joan II of Naples, Kingdom of Naples.

Coat of Arms: a golden ox with a golden letter K, topped with a royal crown, enclosed in a silver patterned border.

Titles of Nobility

Patriziato di Ravello: Patrician of Ravello
Nobili di Bitonto: Noble of Bitonto.          ***The Bove(s) of Bitonto use the spelling Bovio***
Nobili di Monopoli: Noble of Monopoli

House of Bove Palazzo(s)

Palazzo Bove in Bitonto, Italy 

Palazzo Bove in Tramonti, Italy

Prominent members of the House of Bove

Giovanni Bove (13th century), Patrician of Ravello, Bishop of Larino (1221)
Sergio Bove (13th century), Patrician of Ravello; Noble of Bitonto, built Palazzo Bove, and a church in Bitonto
Giacomo Bove (13th century), Patrician of Ravello, the official Royal Court Appointment in Gaeta, Portulano Master, Proxy of Puglia (1291)
Girolamo Bove and Ferdinand Bove, they obtained reintegration Seat of Ravello (2-7-1593)
Antonio Bove (17th century), Patrician of Ravello, Knight of the Order of Malta (1646);
Luigi Bove (18th century), Patrician of Ravello, Bishop of Melfi and Rapolla, Monaco of Montecassino

Notable marriages with other families of the Nobility of Italy

Giovanna Bove, daughter of Giovanni Battista Bove, Patrician of Ravello, and Imperia Caracciolo]
married Giovanni Battista Brancia, Patrician of Sorrento, in Naples April 25, 1605.

Girolamo Bove, Patrician of Ravello, married Cornelia Piscicelli, [daughter of Lucio Piscicelli, Patrician of Naples  on June 26, 1611.

Vittoria Bove, [daughter of Andrea Bove, Patrician of Ravello, and Eleonora Bove] 
married Lelio Brancia II, Patrician of Sorrento, in Sorrento February 3, 1627.

Cornelia Brancia, [daughter of Lelio Brancia II, Patrician of Sorrento, and Vittoria Bove]
married Antonio Teodoro, Patrician of Sorrento May 1, 1651.

Literature
Ravello e il suo patriziato, Antonio Guerritore 
Enciclopedia storico-nobiliare italiana 
 Enciclopedia Araldica Italiana 
 Memorie storico-diplomatiche dell'antica città e ducato di Amalfi 
 Archivio Storico Italiano 
 The Stones of Naples: Church Building in Angevin Italy, 1266-1343 
 Istoria della città e costiera di Amalfi in due parti divisa 
 Giacomo Rogadeo, Ravellese di Bitonto 
Analecta Romana Instituti Danici 
La noblesse dans les territoires angevins à la fin du Moyen Age 
l commercio a Napoli e nell'Italia meridionale nel XV secolo 
Alcuni fatti riguardanti Carlo i. di Angiò, dal 1252 al 1270, tratti dall'archivio angioino di Napoli camillo minieri riccio charles 
Quellen und Forschungen aus italienischen Archiven und Bibliotheken 
Revue historique 
Annuaire de la Société française de numismatique 
Il regno di Carlo I0 d'Angiò dal 2 gennaio 1273 al 31 dicembre 1283 
Itinerari e centri urbani nel Mezzogiorno normanno-svevo 
Mediterraneo, Mezzogiorno, Europa 
Annali delle Due Sicilie 
Illustrazione dei principali monumenti di arte e di storia del versante amalfitano 
Masserie medievali: masserie, massari e carestie da Federico II alla dogana delle pecore 
Studi meridionali 
Feudalesimo e feudatari in sette secoli di storia di un comune pugliese 
Istoria dell'antica repubblica d'Amalfi 
L'olio vergine d'oliva 
Museo di letteratura e filosofia, per cura di S. Gatti 
Materiali per l'archeologia medievale 
Dizionario storico-blasonico delle famiglie nobili e notabili italiane 
Testi e documenti di storia napoletana 
Scritti di paleografia e diplomatica di archivistica e di erudizione 
Amalfi e la sua costiera nel Settecento 
Il libro e la piazza : le storie locali dei Regni di Napoli e di Sicilia in età moderna 
Cultura e società in Puglia in età sveva e angioina 
Archivio storico per le province napoletane 
Carlo d'Anglò nei rapporti politici e commerciali con Venezia e l'oriente 
Regesto delle pergamene del Capitolo metropolitano e della Curia Arcivescovile de Trani 
Amalfi medioevale 
Cenni storici intorno i grandi uffizii del regno di Sicilia durante il regno di Carlo i. d'Angiò 
Annali di storia economica e sociale 
Elenco dei cavalieri del S.M.ordine di S. Giovanni di Gerusalemme ricevuti nella veneranda lingua d'Italia dalla fondazione dell' ordine ai nostri Giorni 
I registri della Cancelleria angioina 
Dissertazioni storiche e critiche sopra la cavalleria antica e moderna, secolare e regolare: con note, e molte figure in rame 
Cenni storici sulle chiese arcivescovili, vescovili, e prelatizie (nullius) del regno delle due Sicilie 
Gli italiani in Polonia dal IX secolo al XVIII 
Forme di potere e struttura sociale in Italia nel Medioevo

External links
 https://web.archive.org/web/20060508081533/http://www.chiesaravello.com/patriziato/index.asp
 https://web.archive.org/web/20061127041503/http://grimgio.altervista.org/documenti/PATRIZIATO_RAVELLO.htm
 http://www.sardimpex.com/
 http://www.ilportaledelsud.org/cognomi_b1.htm
 https://web.archive.org/web/20070928122736/http://www.disanzadalena.it/b.htm
 http://www.genmarenostrum.com/legislazione/patriziati/PATRIZIATO_RAVELLO.htm

Bove
Ravello
People of the Kingdom of Naples
People from the Province of Salerno
People from Ravello